Kemayoran Athletes Village (Indonesian: Wisma Atlet Kemayoran) is a building complex located in Kemayoran District, Jakarta, Indonesia. The site was developed as the athlete's village for the 2018 Asian Games and 2018 Asian Para Games which was held in Jakarta, built on an area of 10 hectares land, which had 7,424 apartments in 10 towers. Total accommodation capacity of 22,272 at the village exceeded International Olympic Committee standards, which require Olympics hosts to provide rooms for at least 14,000 athletes.


Use as COVID-19 hospital

During the COVID-19 pandemic in Indonesia, 4 towers were converted to emergency field hospitals. On 18 March 2020, the Ministry of Finance announced Kemayoran Athletes Village will be converted to house COVID-19 patients who show only mild symptoms after consultation from doctors. The conversion was officially completed on 23 March. With a capacity of 3,000 beds, it is one of the biggest COVID-19 pandemic field hospitals in the world, being 3 times bigger than Huoshenshan Hospital or 2 times bigger than Leishenshan Hospital, both in Wuhan.

With the 30 December 2022 government announcement on revocation of the Community Activities Restrictions Enforcement, 3 towers of the emergency hospital were decommissioned, leaving only one tower active.

References 

Buildings and structures in Jakarta
2018 Asian Games
Buildings and structures completed in 2018
Accommodations for sports competitions
2018 establishments in Indonesia
Venues of the 2018 Asian Games
Hospitals established for the COVID-19 pandemic
Hospitals in Jakarta
Hospitals established in 2020
COVID-19 pandemic in Indonesia